The 2019 Gagarin Cup playoffs of the Kontinental Hockey League (KHL) began on 25 February 2019, with the top eight teams from each of the conferences, following the conclusion of the 2018–19 KHL regular season. The playoffs ended on 19 April 2019, when Continental Cup winners CSKA Moscow became the first team to win the Gagarin Cup finals in a series sweep, defeating Avangard Omsk in four games to win their first Gagarin Cup, after two previous Finals defeats.

Playoff seeds
After the regular season, the standard 16 teams qualified for the playoffs.

Western Conference
The regular season winners and Continental Cup winners were CSKA Moscow with 106 points.

Eastern Conference
Avtomobilist Yekaterinburg were the Eastern Conference regular season winners with 95 points.

Playoff bracket
In each round, the highest remaining seed in each conference is matched against the lowest remaining seed. The higher-seeded team is awarded home ice advantage. In the Gagarin Cup Finals, home ice is determined based on regular season points. Each best-of-seven series follows a 2–2–1–1–1 format: the higher-seeded team plays at home for games one and two (and games five and seven, if necessary), and the lower-seeded team is at home for games three and four (and game six, if necessary).

First round

Eastern Conference first round

(1) Avtomobilist Yekaterinburg vs. (8) Traktor Chelyabinsk
Avtomobilist Yekaterinburg finished first in the Eastern Conference earning 95 points. Traktor Chelyabinsk finished as the Eastern Conference's eighth seed, earning 58 points, and averaging 1.64 goals per game, the lowest recorded tally for any playoff-qualifying team. This was the first playoff meeting between the two teams; Avtomobilist Yekaterinburg won all four games in this year's regular season series.

(2) Barys Astana vs. (7) Torpedo Nizhny Novgorod
Barys Astana finished second in the Eastern Conference earning 86 points. Torpedo Nizhny Novgorod finished as the Eastern Conference's seventh seed, earning 64 points. This was the first playoff meeting between the two teams, and they split their two-game regular season series.

(3) Metallurg Magnitogorsk vs. (6) Salavat Yulaev Ufa
Metallurg Magnitogorsk finished third in the Eastern Conference earning 84 points. Salavat Yulaev Ufa finished as the Eastern Conference's sixth seed, earning 72 points. This was the fifth playoff meeting between the two teams, with the previous four series having been shared; Metallurg Magnitogorsk won the most recent series during the 2016 Gagarin Cup playoffs. This year's two-game regular season series was also shared.

(4) Avangard Omsk vs. (5) Ak Bars Kazan
Avangard Omsk finished fourth in the Eastern Conference earning 83 points. Ak Bars Kazan, the reigning Gagarin Cup champions, finished as the Eastern Conference's fifth seed, one point behind Avangard Omsk. This was the fourth playoff meeting between the two teams with Ak Bars Kazan winning all three previous series, the most recent of which was during the 2017 Gagarin Cup playoffs. This year's two-game regular season series was shared, with both games going to overtime.

In the opening game, a two-goal performance by Sergei Shumakov and a 21-save shutout at home by goaltender Igor Bobkov led Avangard Omsk to a 6–0 win. In the second game, another strong offensive performance coupled with the play of Bobkov gained them a two-game lead, with a 6–3 victory. Despite an early showing by Ak Bars Kazan, Avangard Omsk took a stranglehold in game three on the road on Denis Zernov's second period game-winner, ultimately winning 4–1. Finally, in game four, Shumakov scored all three goals – his first playoffs hat-trick – on the night, as Avangard Omsk swept Ak Bars Kazan in four successive games, marking the first time that the defending champions were beaten in such a manner in the first round of the playoffs.

Western Conference first round

(1) CSKA Moscow vs. (8) Vityaz Podolsk
CSKA Moscow finished first in the Western Conference earning 106 points. Vityaz Podolsk finished as the Western Conference's eighth seed, earning 63 points. This was the first playoff meeting between the two teams; CSKA Moscow won three of the four games in this year's regular season series.

(2) SKA Saint Petersburg vs. (7) Spartak Moscow
SKA Saint Petersburg finished second in the Western Conference earning 103 points. Spartak Moscow finished as the Western Conference's seventh seed, earning 64 points. This was the third playoff meeting between the two teams, with the previous two series having been shared; SKA Saint Petersburg swept the most recent series during the 2011 Gagarin Cup playoffs. SKA Saint Petersburg won all four games in this year's regular season series.

(3) Lokomotiv Yaroslavl vs. (6) HC Sochi
Lokomotiv Yaroslavl finished second in the Western Conference earning 86 points. HC Sochi finished as the Western Conference's sixth seed, earning 66 points. This was the first playoff meeting between the two teams, and they split their four-game regular season series.

(4) Jokerit vs. (5) Dynamo Moscow
Jokerit finished fourth in the Western Conference earning 80 points. Ak Bars Kazan finished as the Western Conference's fifth seed, earning 72 points. This was the first playoff meeting between the two teams; Dynamo Moscow won all four games in this year's regular season series, extending a winning streak, stretching back to 17 September 2015, to eleven games over Jokerit. Dynamo Moscow extended the streak to thirteen, before Jokerit won Game 3.

Conference Semi-Finals

Eastern Conference Semi-Finals

(1) Avtomobilist Yekaterinburg vs. (6) Salavat Yulaev Ufa
This was the second playoff meeting between these teams, with Salavat Yulaev winning the series played in 2010.

(2) Barys Astana vs. (4) Avangard Omsk
This was the second playoff meeting between these teams, with Avangard winning the series played in 2015.

Western Conference Semi-Finals

(1) CSKA Moscow vs. (5) Dynamo Moscow
This was the third playoff meeting between these teams, with Dynamo having won both previous series.

(2) SKA Saint Petersburg vs. (3) Lokomotiv Yaroslavl
This was the fifth playoff meeting between these teams, with SKA winning the three past seasons and Lokomotiv winning in 2014.

Conference finals

Eastern Conference finals

(4) Avangard Omsk vs. (6) Salavat Yulaev Ufa
This was the fourth playoff meeting between these teams, with Avangard Omsk winning the series played in 2009 and Salavat Yulaev Ufa winning in 2016 and 2018. This represents the lowest-seeded Conference Final match-up in KHL history, with the winners becoming the lowest seed to play in a Gagarin Cup final series.

In Game 3, Joonas Kemppainen's eventual game-winning goal – his ninth goal of the playoffs – set the record for most playoff goals by a Salavat Yulaev Ufa player in one season, breaking the record set by Alexander Radulov in 2010. In Game 6, the longest game in Conference Finals history, Salavat Yulaev Ufa goaltender Juha Metsola made 69 saves, a record in the KHL.

Western Conference finals

(1) CSKA Moscow vs. (2) SKA Saint Petersburg
This was the sixth playoff meeting between these teams, with SKA winning the first three playoff series and CSKA winning the two most recent series.

Gagarin Cup Finals
This is the first playoff meeting between these teams, and CSKA's third and Avangard's second appearance in the Gagarin Cup Finals.

(W1) CSKA Moscow vs. (E4) Avangard Omsk 
In the opening game of the series, CSKA Moscow's Mikhail Grigorenko scored the first hat-trick in the Gagarin Cup Finals, including the game-winning goal.

Player statistics

Scoring leaders

The following players led the league in points, at the conclusion of the playoffs. If two or more skaters are tied (i.e. same number of points, goals and played games), all of the tied skaters are shown.

Leading goaltenders
The following goaltenders led the league in goals against average, at the conclusion of the playoffs.

Notes

References

External links

2018–19 KHL season
Gagarin Cup